California's 65th State Assembly district is one of 80 California State Assembly districts. It is currently represented by Democrat Sharon Quirk-Silva of Fullerton.

District profile 
The district encompasses parts of north Orange County, anchored by the city of Fullerton. The primarily suburban district is ethnically and socioeconomically diverse.

Orange County – 15.3%
 Anaheim – 38.9%
 Buena Park
 Cypress
 Fullerton
 Garden Grove – 0.4%
 La Palma
 Stanton

Election results from statewide races

List of Assembly Members 
Due to redistricting, the 65th district has been moved around different parts of the state. The current iteration resulted from the 2011 redistricting by the California Citizens Redistricting Commission.

Election results 1992 - present

2020

2018

2016

2014

2012

2010

2008

2006

2004

2002

2000

1998

1996

1994

1992

See also 
 California State Assembly
 California State Assembly districts
 Districts in California

References

External links 
 District map from the California Citizens Redistricting Commission

65
Government in Orange County, California
Government of Anaheim, California
Government of Fullerton, California
Buena Park, California
Cypress, California
Garden Grove, California
La Palma, California